Kujawiak is a Polish folk dance

Kujawiak may also refer to:
 person living at Kuyavia (Kujawy)
 person from Kuyavians ethnographic group
 ORP Kujawiak, Polish Navy ships 
 Kujawiak (beer) (pl/de/nl), Polish beer from Bydgoszcz

 Kujawiak Astoria Bydgoszcz, basketball team from Bydgoszcz, Poland name in 1997-2000
 Kujawiak Kowal, football club from Kowal, Poland
 Kujawiak Włocławek, football and athletics club from Włocławek, Poland
 alias of Julian Marchlewski (1866–1925), Polish communist politician
 Kujawiak konspiracyjny/Kujawiak partyzancki, poem by Krystyna Krahelska
 Kujawiak in A minor (1853) and Kujawiak in C major by Henryk Wieniawski
 Kujawiak, Op. 31/2 by Felix Blumenfeld
 Kujawiak and Oberek for two xylophones and orchestra (1952) by Mieczysław Weinberg